The Continental Divide National Scenic Trail (in short Continental Divide Trail, CDT) is a United States National Scenic Trail with a length measured by the Continental Divide Trail Coalition of  between the U.S. border with Chihuahua, Mexico and the border with Alberta, Canada. The CDT follows the Continental Divide of the Americas along the Rocky Mountains and traverses five U.S. states — Montana, Idaho, Wyoming, Colorado, and New Mexico. In Montana near the Canadian border the trail crosses Triple Divide Pass (near Triple Divide Peak, from which waters may flow to either the Arctic Ocean (via Hudson Bay), Atlantic Ocean or Pacific Ocean).

In 2021, the CDT was about 70 percent complete, with a combination of dedicated trails and dirt and paved roads. Hikers can continue north into Alberta and British Columbia via the Great Divide Trail to Kakwa Lake in Kakwa Provincial Park and Protected Area, B.C., north of Jasper National Park. 

The CDT was described in 2013 by a Triple Crown hiker as "Raw, wild, remote and unfinished; it is a trail that will make use of all the skills of an experienced backpacker. It is also a trail that is beautiful, stunning and perhaps the most rewarding of the major long-distance hiking trails." Distances given are approximate as sections of the trail are uncompleted and the trail is sometimes re-routed.

History

The establishment of the Appalachian Trail and the Pacific Crest Trail inspired proposals to create a Continental Divide trail. The first section of the proposed trail was laid out in Colorado in 1962 by the Rocky Mountain Trails Association.  In 1965, President Lyndon Johnson proposed a national system of trails and in 1968 the U.S. Congress adopted the National Trails System Act. 

In 1978, the Continental Divide Trail was formally established with the responsibility for management given to the U.S. Forest Service. Portions of the trail already existed and a few hikers claimed to have walked from Mexico to Canada on the informal trail, among them Jim Wolf, A Baltimore lawyer who had hiked the Appalachian Trail in 1971, and whose account of that journey appears in the two-volume book, Hiking the Appalachian Trail. Wolf envisioned a similar trail running along the Continental Divide, and in 1978, he organized the Continental Divide Trail Society, which advocated for the newly designated National Scenic Trail and published several early guidebooks.

Progress in completing the trail was slow and interest in hiking the complete trail was minimal. By 1995, only 15 people were recorded as having hiked the whole trail, still largely unfinished. In that same year, the Continental Divide Trail Alliance (CDTA) was created and with volunteers built or improved the route of the trail.  In 2012, the Continental Divide Trail Coalition replaced the CDTA to coordinate the efforts of several regional partners engaged in constructing and maintaining the trail. Thru-hikers increased from four in 1999 to more than 150 in 2019, and uncounted thousands hiked sections of the trail every year. Horseback riding is permitted on the trail; mountain biking is only permitted on a few sections.

Thru-hikers of the Continental Divide Trail, the Appalachian Trail (AT) and the Pacific Crest Trail (PCT) achieve what is known as the Triple Crown of Hiking. As of the end of the application period in late 2021, 525 hikers have been designated Triple Crowners since 1994 by the American Long Distance Hiking Association—West. More than 1,000 thru-hikers completed either the AT or PCT in 2019 compared to 150 completing the CDT, a reflection of the isolation and difficulty in hiking the CDT.

Thru-hiking
Successfully thru-hiking the entire Continental Divide Trail takes an average of five months. The definition of a thru-hike is left to the judgment of the hikers. The purists hike a "continuous and unbroken footpath between Mexico and Canada," but about 50 percent of the thru-hikers admit to having skipped small sections of road-walking or because the trail was closed, mostly due to forest fires or snow. All hikers must replenish their food every few days, often hitchhiking from a road crossing of the trail into a town to buy food and supplies. Most hikers occasionally take a "zero", a day without hiking, or a "nero", a day with little hiking, to rest and recuperate. "Trail angels" (volunteers) at locations along the trail assist hikers with food, water, and transportation to and from resupply points to trail heads. A few hikers, especially those attempting to set speed records, are "supported," meaning they have helpers who meet or accompany them along the trail and perform non-hiking tasks, such as food preparation. Permits are required to hike or camp along some sections of the trail and a passport is needed to cross the Canadian border. 

Most thru-hikers begin the hike in April in New Mexico, hike northbound, and finish at the Canadian border in August or September. If hikers begin too early they may encounter heavy and near impassable snow conditions in the southern San Juan and San Juan Mountains of Colorado, and if the hiker finishes too late they may also encounter heavy snow in Glacier National Park near the Canadian border. A few thru-hikers hike southbound (SOBO) from the Canadian border beginning in June and finishing in October or November. They may also encounter adverse weather conditions. A few hikers "flip-flop," hiking different sections of the trail when the weather is most favorable rather than sequentially. The most common problems reported by thru-hikers are injury and snow. Extra equipment carried might include an ice ax and bear spray.  

In 2019, the respondents to a survey of CDT thru-hikers were two-thirds male with a median age of 31. Three-fourths were from the United States and the remainder came from eleven other countries. The average number of days (including "zeros") to complete the hike was 147.

David Odell was the first person to thru-hike the (still undefined) CDT in 1977, although there was an earlier claim.  In 1978 three women hiked the entire trail: Nancy Andujar and the team of Jean Ella and Lynne Wisegart. In 2007, Francis Tapon became the first person to do a round backpacking trip "yo-yo" on the Continental Divide Trail when he through-hiked from Mexico to Canada and back to Mexico on the CDT. This seven-month journey spanned over 5,600 miles. Tapon took the most circuitous, scenic, high, difficult route north and while returning south, took the more expedient route. Andrew Skurka completed the trail as part of the 6,875-mile Great Western Loop in 2007. Olive "Raindance" McGloin, yo-yoed in 2020 becoming the first woman on her second attempt (McGloin also yo-yoed the PCT in 2014).

The youngest person to thru-hike the trail is Reed Gjonnes, who hiked the trail with her father Eric Gjonnes from April 15, 2013 to September 6, 2013 in one continuous northbound hike at age 13.

Route
The Continental Divide Trail closely follows the Continental Divide, but has a large number of approved alternate routes, some of which are more utilized than the official trail. The trail is incomplete in a few sections, especially in New Mexico, which requires walking on roads. Ninety-five percent of the trail is located on public land, including National Parks, National Forests, and land managed by the Bureau of Land Management. There are few facilities along the trail itself, and it is usually necessary for the hiker to leave the trail to resupply or find lodging.

70% (2,170 miles) of the trail is along land managed by the U.S. Forest Service. The rest is on land managed by the Bureau of Land (12% or 372 miles), National Parks (10% or 310 miles), and state and private lands (8% or 248 miles).

New Mexico

 
Much of the CDT route in New Mexico traverses desert and dry mountains and a challenge to hikers is finding drinking water.

Three southern termini of the trail exist: 1) Crazy Cook Monument, the official CDT southern terminus, east of the Big Hatchet Mountains; 2) Antelope Wells, New Mexico; and 3) near Columbus, New Mexico. The Crazy Cook Monument in New Mexico's bootheel  is the most commonly used starting or finishing point of the CDT, but due to its remote location lacks lodging and other services.

Notable points on the CDT in New Mexico from south to north include: 
Crazy Cook Monument.
Animas and Playas Valleys. In the Chihuahua Desert water is scarce and the trail route is mostly informal.  
Big Burro Mountains. The first wooded areas on the CDT for the north-bound hiker. 
Silver City, New Mexico. The CDT passes through the town, a rest and resupply center. 
Gila Wilderness. Ninety-five percent of thru-hikers take the Gila River alternate trail which goes through the scenic canyon of the river. Voted third among favorite sections of the CDT by hikers in 2019. 
Pie Town. A hiker and biker-friendly hamlet on the trail with a hostel (the "Toaster House") supported by hiker's donations and a restaurant which serves pie.  
El Malpaís National Monument. Most hikers take a shorter alternate route by-passing much of the tortured lava fields of El Malpais. 
Grants, New Mexico. A rest and resupply center. The CDT crosses Interstate 40 here. 
Mount Taylor. Most thru-hikers summit Mount Taylor, the highest point on the CDT in New Mexico.   
San Pedro Parks Wilderness.
Ghost Ranch. A retreat and education center, the former home of artist Georgia O'Keeffe, and a popular site for filming Western movies.  
Chama, New Mexico. A resupply center and near the beginning of the long and difficult hike through the San Juan Mountains of southern Colorado.

Colorado
 

In most areas the CDT is well marked. Mountain bikes are allowed on parts of the Colorado Trail. Depending on any given year's snow-pack and a hiker's individual schedule, alternative routes are available. Forest fires often result in parts of the trail being closed and the hiker must take alternative routes. Another hazard to hikers is Colorado's 'monsoon season' with violent afternoon thunderstorms that are common in July and August on high mountain ridges 

Notable points on the CDT in Colorado from south to north include:

 Cumbres and Toltec Scenic Railroad. The CDT crosses the narrow-gauge heritage railroad  inside Colorado.
 South San Juan Wilderness. The hiker entering the southern San Juan Mountains until mid- to late-June often finds nearly impassable snow-packs and hazardous conditions. Many take a lower and less difficult route. 
 Wolf Creek Pass. The CDT crosses U.S. Highway 160 near a ski area.  
 Creede cut off. Due to snow or forest fires in the San Juan Mountains many hikers choose to take this lower and shorter route which follows the Rio Grande River through Creede and rejoins the main CDT at Spring Creek Pass
 San Juan Mountains and Weminuche Wilderness. In a 2019 survey, the San Juans were voted fourth among favorite sections of the CDT. Snow can be a major problem for hikers, requiring alternate routes, until July 1 and again in October.   
 Salida. In a 2019 survey, Salida was voted the most popular resupply town near the CDT. 
 Collegiate Peaks Wilderness.
 Twin Lakes. At mile number 369 in Colorado for north-bound hikers, Twin Lakes is the first town in Colorado located on the CDT and is a rest and resupply center. 
 Mount Elbert and Mount Massive. Colorado's highest peaks are near the CDT.
 Grays Peak. The highest summit on the CDT has an elevation of  
 Grand Lake. The CDT follows the shorelines of Lake Granby, Shadow Mountain Lake, and Grand Lake to the rest and resupply village of Grand Lake.  
 Rocky Mountain National Park. The CDT passes through a corner of the park. Numerous side trails lead to other locations. 
 Parkview Mountain.
 Elk River. The lowest elevation of the CDT in Colorado is  near the border with Wyoming

Wyoming

 

The Rocky Mountains of Colorado terminate in southern Wyoming and the CDT passes through a through a long section of desert range-land in the middle of the state, known as the Great Divide Basin. Hikers must decide on a route through the Great Divide Basin as the actual Continental Divide forks, forming an endorheic basin. The shortest route is through the middle where water availability is uncertain in most years. The grand finale of the CDT in Wyoming is Yellowstone National Park. The trail exits west to Idaho. Grizzly bears become a possible danger from the Wind River Range northward, especially in and near Yellowstone Park.

Notable points in Wyoming on the CDT from south to north include:

 Bridger Peak. At  the last major summit of the Rocky Mountains before descending into the Red Desert. 
 Rawlins. The CDT passes through this resupply center and crosses Interstate 80. 
 Great Divide Basin. For more than 100 miles from Rawlins to the Wind River Range, the CDT runs through the gently-rolling, water-scarce Red Desert.  
 South Pass. The Oregon Trail, the California Trail and the Mormon Trail traversed this area in the 19th century. 
 Wind River Range. Wilderness areas comprise  of roadless land dotted with lakes, glaciers and peaks rising near the trail to a maximum of    
 Cirque of the Towers.  from the CDT, regarded as the most scenic vista of the Wind River Range.
 Lester Pass.
 Teton Wilderness. Near the CDT is the most remote place in the contiguous United States,  from the nearest road.
 Yellowstone Park. Traversing the southern part of the Park, the CDT passes by Old Faithful and numerous other geysers and hot springs.

Idaho/Montana border

Northbounders leaving Yellowstone National Park in Wyoming enter the Centennial Mountains of Idaho. For the next  the trail closely follows the border of Idaho and Montana, which is also the Continental Divide. Much of the CDT follows high, grassy ridges with some walking on dirt roads required. Water can be scarce and grizzly bears are found near Yellowstone Park.

Notable points on the CDT from south to north along the Idaho/Montana border include:

 Targhee Peak.
 Interstate 15.
 Lemhi Pass. In 1805, Meriwether Lewis of the Lewis and Clark Expedition traversed this pass.
 Elk Mountain.
 Homer Young's Peak.
 North Fork of Sheep Creek. The CDT drops  from the Continental Divide to the lowest point on the Idaho/Montana trail, . 
 Chief Joseph Pass. Chief Joseph and the Nez Percé people, pursued by the U.S. Cavalry, crossed from Idaho into Montana near this pass in 1877 during their flight toward Canada.

Montana

The Montana Wilderness Association is the leading non-profit partner for the northern section of the CDT. MWA staff work to maintain the CDT in Montana and Idaho with the help of volunteers and agency partners.

The CDT trail goes east from the Idaho border, circles around the city of Butte, then turns north toward Glacier National Park via the Lewis and Clark National Forest and through three National Wilderness areas. Several alternate trails shorten the meandering route of the official CDT in Montana. Some road walking is required. Frequent forest fires in late summer often force closure of sections of the trail and early snowfalls in late September may make the trail in Glacier National Park impassable.

Notable points from south to north on the CDT in Montana include:
 Anaconda-Pintler Wilderness. West Goat Peak, is the highest point near the trail in Montana.
 Anaconda cutoff. Most thru-hikers take this alternate route, which is  shorter than the official CDT and passes through the town of Anaconda. 
 Interstate 15.
 Interstate 90.
 Interstate 15.
 Bob Marshall Wilderness complex.
 Chinese Wall.
 East Glacier Park Village. At the entrance of Glacier National Park, the CDT is routed through the village and hikers resupply here for long treks whether going north or south. 
 Glacier National Park. The park was voted second among favorite sections of the CDT by hikers in 2019. The trails in the park are well-maintained and sometimes crowded. Grizzly bears are present. Due to snow in late September north-bound thru-hikers may take alternate routes to reach the Canadian border by road walking. 
 Waterton Park. The village, four miles inside Canada in Waterton Lakes National Park, is the official starting and ending point of the CDT.

See also
Other Triple Crown trails
Appalachian Trail
Pacific Crest Trail
Connected National Scenic Trail
Pacific Northwest Trail - Shares a common start/end point with the CDT in Glacier National Park.
Connected National Historic Trails
California Trail
Lewis and Clark National Historic Trail
Mormon Pioneer Trail
Nez Perce Trail
Old Spanish Trail
Oregon Trail
Pony Express National Historic Trail
Connected U.S. long-distance trails
Colorado Trail - the two trails coincide for about 
Great Divide Mountain Bike Route - parallel, sometimes shared tread

References

External links

 CDT Montana, Montana Wilderness Association
 Continental Divide Trail Society
 Continental Divide Trail Coalition
 Continental Divide National Scenic Trail in Rocky Mountain National Park (National Park Service)
 Jonathan Ley's CDT Hike - a hiker's website
 Beaverhead-Deerlodge National Forest web site - Describes the northernmost parts of the trail
 Continental Divide National Scenic Trail - BLM page
 CDT-L - Continental Divide Trail Mailing List
 Mailing Label Maker - Continental Divide Trail Mailing Label Maker
 CDT Thru hiking Resources - Listing of important resources to thru hike the CDT
 A Quick & Dirty CDT Planning Guide - A general overview of the CDT for planning purposes
 Francis Tapon's CDT Yo-Yo hike - a website of the first person who made a round-trip on the CDT
 Hiking Journals from people on The Continental Divide Trail
 CDT Photo Montage to music by Walkin Jim Stoltz  
 Trail of highways resources - Continental Divide Trail is a Tree with Many Branches
 
 , a documentary by the first two women to hike the CDT in 1978. 
Map Resources
 CDT Coalition Zoomable map. Uses Bear Creek quality points.
 Bear Creek Survey High Quality Professional GPS Mappers and Maps. Some are free.
 Postholer Various High Quality some free.
 Johathan Ley. Map resources page. The KML version has many alternates.
 Way Marked Trails. Uses OpenStreetMap CDT data. With GPX/KML downloads.

National Scenic Trails of the United States
Hiking trails in Montana
Hiking trails in Idaho
Hiking trails in Wyoming
Hiking trails in Colorado
Hiking trails in New Mexico
Trail
New Mexico Bootheel
Long-distance trails in the United States
1978 establishments in the United States
Units of the National Landscape Conservation System
Rocky Mountain National Park